mycityvenue is a UK-based experiences website offering things to do across the UK and other cities in Europe. mycityvenue initially launched as an events site and putting on parties across the UK such as Azealia Banks in The Old Vic Tunnels, London Fashion Week after-parties and their own city festival. The company also created one off events featuring artists and performers including Morcheeba, Noisettes, Delilah (musician), Trevor Nelson, Zalon, Amy Winehouse, and several more. As well as their ticketed events, mycityvenue works a pay-per-click model with its partners. The website switched to a pay per reservation structure in 2013 with over 1200 UK venues see.
mycityvenue publishes a weekly newsletter which is circulated to is 1.4 million subscribers.

History
mycityvenue was founded by entrepreneur William Sachiti and launched in 2011 as UK-based event search which lets users find and book a night out, pitching itself as a kind of ‘digital concierge service’ by consolidating the whole process and moving it online.  After travel company Secret Escapes raised $13 million from Google, Index Ventures, Octopus Ventures and Atlas Venture, mycityvenue was acquired in an all-cash-and-stock deal.

See also
Expedia
Travelocity

References

External links
Official Website
Digital Nomad

Comparison shopping websites
British travel websites
Companies established in 2011